The Pack was a hip hop group formed in Berkeley, California in 2004. The group consisted of Lil B (Brandon McCartney), Young L (Lloyd Omadhebo), Stunnaman (Keith Jenkins), and Lil Uno (Damonte Johnson). They all recorded together for over a year at Young L's home studio where they released their first two mixtapes Wolfpack Muzik Vol. 1 and Wolfpack Muzik Vol. 2. The Pack expanded their fanbase and eventually got signed to a major label, when Too Short signed The Pack to his Jive Records-distributed label Up All Nite Records. The Pack is usually known for their skateboard raps and the sexually explicit content of many of their songs. The group is best known for the track "Vans". The Pack has also collaborated with musicians such as Soulja Boy, Wiz Khalifa, Dev, and The Cataracs.

Members
 Lil B (Brandon Christopher McCartney) - rapper, record producer
 Young L (Lloyd Tomobor Enibu Omadhebo) - rapper, record producer
 Stunnaman (Keith Jenkins) - rapper
 Lil Uno (Damonte Johnson) - rapper

Music career

Skateboards 2 Scrapers EP and Based Boys (2006–2008)
Soon after, The Pack created 2006's sneaker anthem, "Vans" and released it via their MySpace page. The song was heard by veteran Oakland rapper Too Short who then signed them to his Up All Nite Records imprint via Jive Records. The Pack's hit song "Vans" was number 23 on the top 30 hip hop charts, played on 65 hip hop stations nationwide on 35 pop stations nationwide. It was also listed at No.5 on Rolling Stones "Best songs of 2006". The song featured a chorus of "Got my Vans on, but they look like sneakers; (You) wearing coke whites but my Vans look cleaner." The music video for "Vans" aired on BET, but MTV, and MTV Jams, refused to show the video because it promoted a consumer product. However, MTV aired an edited version of the video, in which the word "Vans" was censored throughout the song. The Pack released a seven track EP in 2006 entitled Skateboards 2 Scrapers, which included hits such as "Vans" and "I'm Shinin". In 2007, The Pack put out their debut album Based Boys, which included the single "In My Car". In early 2008, it was announced that The Pack was dropped from Jive Records/Zomba Label Group due to their album's lackluster sales. The Pack recently signed with Los Angeles-based Indie Pop which is home to other artists such as The Cataracs, Dev, and Bobby Brackins. In November 2010, Lil B and Young L were featured on the cover of the publication The FADER, in its 71st issue.

Wolfpack Party (2009–2010)
The Pack began recording again throughout 2009. They released the mixtape The Pack Is Back in December 2009, their first set of material in a year.
Their second studio album, Wolfpack Party, was released on August 24, 2010 and includes the group's newest single "Wolfpack Party," produced by The Cataracs.

Discography

Studio albums

Mixtapes
2005: Wolfpack Muzik Vol. 1
2006: Wolfpack Muzik Vol. 2
2008: Wolfpack Musik Vol. 3: Screamin' Demons
2009: The Pack is Back

Extended plays
2006: Skateboards 2 Scrapers
2010: Sex on the Beach

Singles
2006: "Vans" (Skateboards 2 Scrapers and Based Boys)"  #58 US"
2006: "I'm Shinin'" (Skateboards 2 Scrapers and Based Boys)
2007: "In My Car" (Based Boys)
2010: "Wolfpack Party 2010" (Wolfpack Party)
2010: "Sex on the Beach" (Wolfpack Party)
2010: "Dance Fl00r" (Wolfpack Party)
2018: "Clips Go" ("Clips Go")

References

External links

Official Blog

Hip hop groups from California
Musical groups established in 2004
Musical groups from Berkeley, California
2004 establishments in California